The Secretary for Financial Services and the Treasury, head of Financial Services and the Treasury Bureau of the Hong Kong Government, is responsible for the monitoring of financial services sector and maintaining the assets of the government.

The position was created on 1 July 2002, when the Principal Officials Accountability System was introduced, by merging the previous positions of Secretary for the Treasury and Secretary for Financial Services.

List of office holders
Political party:

Secretary for Monetary Affairs, 1976–1993

Secretary for Financial Services, 1993–1997

Secretary for Financial Services, 1997–2002

Secretaries for Financial Services and the Treasury, 2002–present

Under Secretary for Financial Services and the Treasury 

 Julia Leung (2008–2013)
 James Lau (2014–2017)
 Joseph Chan (2017–present)

References

External links
Government of HKSAR
 Organisation chart of Hong Kong Government

Government ministers of Hong Kong
Financial Services and Treasury